Pudhu Pudhu Arthangal is a 1989 Indian Tamil-language romantic drama film, written and directed by K. Balachander. The film stars Rahman (credited as Raghu) and Geetha, with Sowcar Janaki, Jayachitra, Janagaraj and Sithara in supporting roles. It was released on 28 October 1989. The film won a Filmfare Award South, and two Tamil Nadu State Film Awards.

Plot 
Manibharathi is a famous singer who lives with his possessive wife Gowri. Tricked into marriage by his convincing mother-in-law, what really irks Bharathi is his wife's inability to deal with his rabid female fans. Tensions escalate until Bharathi flees from home and ends up encountering someone else named Jyothi who's also escaping from her life as a dancer because her husband made her dance forcefully and tried forcing her to be a prostitute. Then, he makes a living in Goa with Jyothi.

Then ManiBharathi get a prank call from his PA that Gowri is ill. So he comes back with Jyothi from Goa, which makes Gowri angry and she doesn't let Jyothi in without knowing who she is. Bharathi gets angry and they stay in another one of his houses. Bharathi gets so angry that he claims that he loves Jyothi and that she cannot go because of her problems. So Gowri files for a divorce and informs news reporters about Jyothi. Jyothi's husband appears later in the story. Gowri plans to marry a cricket player Guru. Guru had proposed to her in the past. He accepts the proposal and abandons one of his fans, Yamuna, who is obsessed with him. Later, Yamuna commits suicide in the marriage hall readied for Gowri's marriage. Gowri's mother and her PA feel that she is mentally unstable. Her mother begs Bharathi to go and see her in the hospital and he goes with Jyothi to see her. Jyothi then sees that Bharathi and Gowri belong to each other. Jyothi later finds her husband, who was indeed in love with her. After that, Bharathi goes to recording with him being happy and visits his wife in the hospital.

Cast 
 Raghu as Manibharathi
Geetha as Gowri
Sowcar Janaki as Baby Fernandez
Jayachitra as Kanchanamala
Janagaraj as Jolly
Sithara as Jyothi
K. S. Jayalakshmi as Krishnaveni
Lalitha Kumari as Jolly's wife
Chi. Guru Dutt as Guru
 Shabana as Yamuna
Poornam Viswanathan as Ruby Fernandez
Charle as Diwakar, Reporter
Vivek as Vittal

Cameo appearances
Ilaiyaraaja as himself in "Kalayanamalai" song
Kuyili
Visu
Vaali
Vinu Chakravarthy
Disco Shanthi
G. Venkateswaran
Delhi Ganesh
Keyaar

Production 
Sithara from Kerala was introduced as an actress through this film. It also marked the acting debut of Chi. Guru Dutt. Balachander chose Kala as the lead dance choreographer after being impressed with her work in his previous directorial venture Punnagai Mannan (1986). The dubbing voice for Rahman was provided by Nizhalgal Ravi.

Themes and influences 
According to T. A. Narasimhan of Hindu Tamil Thisai, the film is said to be based on the stage play Kaaranam Kettu Vaadi by Chitralaya Gopu.

Soundtrack 
The music was composed by Ilaiyaraaja and the lyrics were written by Vaali. This was the final collaboration between Ilaiyaraaja and Balachander. According to journalist Kamini Mathai, Ilaiyaraaja could not commit to re-recording as there was a strike; Balachander decided to use background scores from his older films to fill the unfinished portions, angering Ilaiyaraaja and leading to the end of his alliance with Balachander. The song "Kalyana Maalai" is set in the Carnatic raga known as Sindhu Bhairavi, "Eduthu Naan Vidava" is set in Bageshri, and "Guruvayurappa" is set in Abheri, "Keladi Kanmani" was later adapted in Hindi as "Chandni Raat Hai", composed by Anand–Milind for Baaghi (1990).

Release and reception 
Pudhu Pudhu Arthangal was released on 28 October 1989, Diwali day. P. S. S. of Kalki opined that Balachander, despite having done so many films, did not have the courage to give a different result.

Accolades

Impact 
Rahman considered Pudhu Pudhu Arthangal to be "the biggest milestone in [his] career" in Tamil, saying, "It helped me set my two legs permanently in [Tamil cinema]". The song "Keladi Kanmani" inspired the title of a 1990 film. A Hindi remake of Pudhu Pudhu Arthangal entered production with Rahul Roy starring, but the film never had a theatrical release.

References

Bibliography

External links 
 

1980s Tamil-language films
1989 films
1989 romantic drama films
Films directed by K. Balachander
Films scored by Ilaiyaraaja
Films with screenplays by K. Balachander
Indian romantic drama films